José Borrell may refer to:

 Josep Borrell (born 1947), Spanish politician,
 José Borrell (field hockey) (born 1953), Spanish field hockey player